North Havra (ocean island) is a small island off south west Shetland. It is 30 metres at its highest point.

Situated 1/3 mile from the ness-end of South Whiteness, the island possess a lighthouse and a couple of small sheep pens (cribs), as well as a couple dozen sheep and different bird species. North Havra is currently owned by Thomas Stout who uses it for crofting.

See also

 List of islands of Scotland

Uninhabited islands of Shetland